is a town located in Iyo District, Ehime Prefecture, Japan.

Geography 
Tobe is almost in the center of Ehime Prefecture, across the Shigenobu River south of Matsuyama City. There are many mountains in the south, and the northern portion of the town occupies the southern tip of the Matsuyama Plain.  The entire Tobe area is located on gentle hills.

Surrounding municipalities 
Ehime Prefecture
 Matsuyama
 Iyo
 Masaki
 Uchiko
 Kumakōgen

Climate
Tobe has a Humid subtropical climate (Köppen Cfa) characterized by warm summers and cool winters with light snowfall.  The average annual temperature in Tobe is 14.3 °C. The average annual rainfall is 1777 mm with September as the wettest month. The temperatures are highest on average in January, at around 25.4 °C, and lowest in January, at around 3.2 °C.

Demographics
Per Japanese census data, the population of Tobe has been generally increasing since the 1960s.

History 
The area of Tobe was part of ancient Iyo Province. There are a number of Kofun period burial mounds within the city limits, and the name of Tobe appears in Nara period records as an estate belonging to the temple of Hōryū-ji. The area was famous from the Heian period onwards for its production of whetstones. During the Edo period, the area was part of the holdings of Matsuyama Domain and was later part of Ōzu Domain and its subsidiary Niiya Domain. The village of Tobe was established with the creation of the modern municipalities system in 1889. It was raised to town status in 1928 and annexed the neighboring village of Haramachi in 1955. On January 1, 2005, the village of Hirota, also from Iyo District, was merged into Tobe.

Government
Tobe has a mayor-council form of government with a directly elected mayor and a unicameral town council of 16 members. Tobe, together with the town of Matsumae, contributes two members to the Ehime Prefectural Assembly. In terms of national politics, the town is part of Ehime 2nd district of the lower house of the Diet of Japan.

Economy
Tobe is famous for the production of Tobe ware ceramics, and there are more than 80 kilns in the town. Agriculture, notably citrus cultivation and light manufacturing (food processing and electrical components) are mainstays of the local economy. The town is also increasing a commuter town for neighboring Matsuyama.

Education
Tobe has four public elementary schools and one public middle school operated by the town government, and one public high school operated by the Ehime Prefectural Board of Education. The Ehime Prefectural University of Health Science is located in the town.

Transportation

Railway
Tobe has no passenger rail service. The nearest stations are Iyotetsu's Matsuyamashi Station or Iyo-Tachibana Station.

Highway 
  Matsuyama Expressway

Local attractions
Tobe Zoological Park
Ehime Prefectural Sports Compex

Noted people from Tobe
Masao Inoue, stage actor, director

Gallery

References

External links

Tobe official website 

Towns in Ehime Prefecture
Tobe, Ehime
Articles containing video clips